The three-letter abbreviation CTY may refer to:
 Console teleTYpe
 CTY is the ICAO airline designator for Cryderman Air Service, United States
 Center for Talented Youth
 Centre for the Talented Youth of Ireland
 county
 a century
 .cty
 Cross City Airport